Mahmudul Haque Rubel is a Bangladesh Nationalist Party politician and the former Member of Parliament of Sherpur-3.

Career
Rubel was elected to parliament from Sherpur-3 as a Bangladesh Nationalist Party candidate in 2001. His father, Md Sherajul Haque, is a former Member of Parliament from Sherpur-3 and his uncle, A. K. M. Fazlul Haque of Bangladesh Awami League, is the incumbent member of parliament.

References

Bangladesh Nationalist Party politicians
Living people
8th Jatiya Sangsad members
Year of birth missing (living people)